MotorScooterMan, or simply ScooterMan or Scooter, is a fictional character in the Gobots toyline, and the subsequent Challenge of the GoBots cartoon where he was voiced by Frank Welker. The character transformed into a motor scooter.

Gobots 

Scooter was the Guardians' resident inventor. He was highly intelligent, and equipped with an array of equipment that allowed him to hack into computers. Scooter was also equipped with a hologram projector, allowing him to create illusions either to confuse enemies or provide himself with cover. He was unarmed, but briefly tried having blasters fitted in place of his hologram projector – however, he eventually realized the latter was more in tune with his personality, and switched back. He enjoys a friendly rivalry with fellow Guardian Turbo, joking about the stronger Guardian's lack of intelligence.

Scooter was one of the names in a word find that had to be solved to win a copy of the Challenge of the Gobots video game from Your Sinclair magazine.

Animated series 
Since his arrival on Earth, Scooter has become good friends with the young human astronaut Nick Burns, finding him to be something of a kindred spirit. However, one thing they do not have in common is that Scooter is a complete coward – Nick regularly has to coax his Gobot friend into action in tight situations. Scooter is simply the youngest Guardian in appearance, personality, and voice.

The Guardians set up a lab to test their power suits on Earth. With Defendor and Blaster patrolling the lab Baron Von Joy and Path Finder tested a new suit on Dozer. Cy-Kill captured and tried to brainwash Scooter, making him sabotage the lab and self-destructing. Rest-Q check out Scooter, but Scooter refused to be examined. Eventually, Scooter was freed from Renegade control. Cy-Kill, Cop-Tur, Crasher, Geeper-Creeper, Pincher, and Snoop attacked the lab, but it was defended by Leader-1, Baron Von Joy, Blaster, Dozer, Dumper, Road Ranger, Scooter, Scratch and Turbo. Although the Guardians were winning the battle, an accidental backfire from Baron Von Joy's weapon allowed the Renegades to escape.

Scooter appeared in "Ultra Zod" season 1 episode 14, where he donned a Power Suit and helped form the Power Warrior Courageous, which defeated Ultra Zod.

Cy-Kill, Cop-Tur, Crasher and Snoop attacked Leader-1, Turbo, Scooter and Small Foot. Crasher wounded Small Foot. After attaining recordings of the Guardians the Renegades retreated. Using the recordings Cy-Kill had Herr Fiend program robot duplicates of the Guardians. When demonstrating Space Bender weapon to Unicom Leader-1 learned that the Renegades were attacking Washington. The Renegades ambushed Leader-1 and replaced him with his duplicate. Leading the Command Center back to Gobotron and getting rid of Scooter and Small Foot the Renegades then released duplicates of Path Finder, Rest-Q, Van Guard and Turbo. Small Foot and Scooter were able to capture the Turbo duplicate and learn where their friends were being held. Cy-Kill then replaced Good Night. Using the duplicate Turbo the Guardians infiltrated the Renegade base, freed the captured Guardians and escape from Spoons and Fitor. Although blocked by the Renegades, Scooter used a hologram of Zod to make the Renegades flee. Making it back to Gobotron the Guardians were attacked by the Guardian duplicates. The real Guardians were able to defeat their duplicates with the aid of the real Zeemon, Hans-Cuff and Rest-Q. Cy-Kill then arrived in Thrustor with more duplicates, but Small Foot was able to stop with robots using the Space Bender, which would fuse their robot brains.

In episode 27, "Tarnished Image" Doctor Go creates a device that allows the Renegades to appear like Guardians. Cy-Kill, Crasher, and Cop-Tur disguise themselves as Leader-1, Scooter, and Turbo and go on a rampage on Earth while the real Guardians are sent on a fake rescue mission. When the Guardians return they are banished from Earth by the humans. The Guardians are eventually able to prove the Renegades staged the attacks, chase them off and capture Doctor Go.

Scooter appeared in "Return of Gobotron" episode 45. He was given one of the Power Suits by the Last Engineer, which featured telekinesis. He combined with the other suits and the Last Engineer's ship to form the Power Warrior Courageous and defeat a fleet of Renegade Thrustors.

Scooter and Small Foot joined Nick and A.J. to watch a car stunt show which was attacked by Crasher, BuggyMan and Fly Trap. Small Foot fought Buggyman and defeated him, but the Renegades regained the upper hand until the Guardians were rescued by Leader-1 and Turbo who arrived in Power Suits. Cy-Kill vowed to gain Power Suits for the Renegades. Scooter decided he needed more firepower, so he had Baron Von Joy remove his damaged holo projector in favor of a blaster unit. Screw Head, Bad Boy and Cop-Tur were sent to attack Unicom bases and distract the Guardians while Cy-Kill, Crasher and Scorp attempted to take the suits from the Guardian Command Center. Small Foot and Scooter were able to delay the Renegades until Leader-1 and Turbo returned to chase away the Renegades. Realizing he was a better Guardian with his holo projector, Scooter had it reinstalled.

Scooter was among the Guardian Gobot forces who aided the Rock Lord Boulder on the planet Cordax.

Comics 
Scooter appeared in the story "El Asedio De Cy-Kill" from the Argentina Gobots comic #8, and he was in "Scooter's Mighty Magnet."

Robo Machines 
In the Eagle comic, Scooter appears without introduction in the second story arc – having presumably been one of the volunteers recruited from Robotron by Ex-El. He served on board the Command Centre as a courier, and was left guarding the Security Forces' base of operations when the other SF Robo Machines set off to battle Casmodon. However, he was persuaded to observe the battle more closely by the SF's human ally, orphan Charlie Brampton. This meant leaving the Command Centre unmanned and unable to support the rest of the SF when the battle turned against them. Scooter (who again seemed to be unarmed, if a lot braver than his cartoon counterpart) narrowly avoided being killed by Cy-Kill, though indirectly helped drive Casmodon off when Charlie was captured and able to disable the Devil Invader from the inside.

Games 
Leader-1 was the playable character and clones of were among the cast in the video game Challenge of the Gobots for the Sinclair, Amstrad and Commodore 64.

Other media 
Scooter has appeared in the animated comedy series Robot Chicken.

He has been voiced by Tom Root, Seth MacFarlane, and Chris Parnell.

Toy 
Gobots Scooter (1983)
Scooter's toy was a re-release of the Machine Robo Scooter Robo figure. It was first issued by Tonka in 1983, and remained available throughout the production of the Gobots toy line. In the packages that predated the cartoon Scooter was labeled a renegade, not a guardian. Packages after the cartoon was released labeled the character a guardian. It was also released in Europe. In 1993, the figure was reissued as part of Bandai's Robo Machines line.

Transformers: Timelines 

Scooter works as a guard at a Trantech lab.

Fun Publications 
Transtech Cy-kill and Scooter appear among the guards of Shockwave in the story "Transcendent" by Fun Publications. They are attacked in the raid on Shockwave's lab by Alpha Trion to free Breakaway.

References 

1986 comics debuts
Television characters introduced in 1983
Fictional cyborgs
Fictional shapeshifters
Gobots
Holography in fiction